Corokia cotoneaster is a flowering plant in the family Argophyllaceae  was described by Étienne Fiacre Louis Raoul in 1846. This plant is commonly known as the wire-netting bush, korokio, or korokia-tarango. The word "Koriko" comes from the Māori language.

Identifications

Corokia cotoneaster is a highly branched shrub with a strongly divaricating habit with rough dark-coloured bark, usually growing to about 3 m in height. Common variable shrubs with thin gray zig-zag twigs that contain small white clusters underneath with dented or rounded edges and on flat, black petioles. Yellow flowers, star-shaped and red fruits. The leaves are variable, depending on altitude and to the degree of exposure to wind, and are obvo-cuneate to obovate-oblong, 2–15 cm long and 1–10 cm wide. The leaves of juveniles are long and spathulate with 3 lobes. Flowers are borne in leaf axils or terminally in groups of 2 to 4 flowers with bright yellow petals. The main flowering season is December to January.

Gallery

References

New Zealand Plant Conservation Network. (2020). Corokia cotoneaster. Retrieved from https://www.nzpcn.org.nz/flora/species/corokia-cotoneaster/ 
Fisher, M. E., & Forde, M. L.(1994). Growing New Zealand Plants, Shrubs & Trees (pp. 35). New Zealand: David Bateman Ltd. 
Howell, C. J., Turnbull, D. K., & Turnbull, M. H. (2002). Moa Ghosts Exorcised? New Zealand's Divaricate Shrubs Avoid Photoinhibition. Functional Ecology, 16(2), pp. 232–240.
Young, L. M., & Kelly, D. (9 April 2014). Current rates of fruit removal and seed dispersal in New Zealand fleshy-fruited mountain plants. New Zealand Journal of Ecology, 38(2) 
Smith-Dodsworth, J. C. (1991). New Zealand Native Shrubs and Climbers (pp. 29). New Zealand: David Bateman Ltd.
MacFarlane, A. E. T., Kelly, D., & Briskie, J. V. (7 December 2015). Introduced blackbirds and song thrushes: useful substitutes for lost mid-sized native frugivores, or weed vectors?. New Zealand Journal of Ecology, 40(1). doi: 10.20417/nzjecol.40.9 
Riley, M. (1985). Shrubs & Small Trees (pp. 28). New Zealand: Viking Sevenseas Ltd.

Argophyllaceae
Flora of New Zealand
Divaricating plants
Plants described in 1846